was a Japanese jazz percussionist and composer.

Togashi grew up in a musical household; his father was a double-bassist in a swing jazz ensemble, and Togashi learned violin and drums, playing the latter in his father's band. He worked with Sadao Watanabe, Toshiko Akiyoshi, and Tony Scott in the 1950s, then founded the ensemble Jazz Academy in 1961 with Hideto Kanai, Masabumi Kikuchi, and Masayuki Takayanagi. He was an early free jazz leader in Japan, playing in this idiom with Yosuke Yamashita and performing with American musicians such as Ornette Coleman, Blue Mitchell, Lee Morgan, and Sonny Rollins on Japanese tours.

Togashi lost the use of his legs in an accident in 1969, and designed a new kit that would allow him to continue playing. Later associations included performing or recording with Paul Bley, Don Cherry, Jack DeJohnette, Charlie Haden, Steve Lacy, Gary Peacock, Albert Mangelsdorff, Masahiko Sato, and Yuji Takahashi.

Discography

As leader/co-leader
 We now create (Victor, 1969)
 Canto of Aries with New Herd (Columbia, 1971)
 Isolation with Mototeru Takagi (Columbia, 1971) - recorded 1969
 Poesy : The Man Who Keeps Washing His Hands with Masabumi Kikuchi, Gary Peacock (Philips, 1971)
  with Masayuki Takayanagi (TBM, 1972) - recorded 1963
  with Masahiko Satoh (Trio, 1973)
 Song for Myself with Sadao Watanabe, Masahiko Satoh, Masabumi Kikuchi (East Wind, 1974)
 Spiritual Nature (East Wind, 1975)
 Guild For Human Music (Denon Jazz, 1976)
 Rings (East Wind, 1976) - solo
 Session In Paris, Vol. 1 "Song Of Soil" (Paddle Wheel, 1979)
  with Yosuke Yamashita (Next Wave, 1980)
 Valencia with Takashi Kako (Trio, 1980)
  with Richard Beirach (Trio, 1980)
 The face of percussion (Paddle Wheel, 1981) - recorded 1980
 The Ballad My Favorite (Paddle Wheel, 1981)
 Spiritual Moments  (Paddle Wheel, 1982)
 Contrastwith Lauren Newton and Peter Kowald (Paddle Wheel, 1983) 
 Eternal duo with Steve Lacy (Paddle Wheel, 1983) - recorded 1981, CD version (DIW, 2015)
 Pulsation with Masayuki Takayanagi (Paddle Wheel, 1983) 
 Breath with Hozan Yamamoto, Yōsuke Yamashita (Denon, 1984)
 Ayers Rock with Richie Beirach, Terumasa Hino (Polydor, 1985)

 Bura Bura (Pan Music, 1986) - live
 Scene (Cornelius, 1987)
 Place - Space Who (Egg Farm, 1987)
 Wave with Gary Peacock and Masahiko Satoh (East Wind, 1987)
 Wave II with Gary Peacock and Masahiko Satoh (East Wind, 1988)
 Wave III with Gary Peacock and Masahiko Satoh (NEC Avenue, 1988)
 Essence of Jazz (Art Union, 1990)
 Senza Tempo with Haruna Miyake, Yuji Takahashi, Jean-François and Jenny-Clark (Egg Farm, 1990)
 Concerto with Masabumi Kikuchi (Ninety-One, 1991)
 Twilight with Steve Lacy (Ninety-One, 1992) - recorded 1991
 Passing in the silence (AMJ, 1993) - solo
 Triple Helix with Terumasa Hino, Masabumi Kikuchi (Enja, 1993)
 Richard Beirach - Terumasa Hino - Masahiko Togashi (Konnex, 1993)
 Eternal Duo ’95 with Steve Lacy (Take One, 1996) - recorded 1995
 Inter-Action: Live At Hall Egg Farm On December 9, 1995 (Take One, 1996) - recorded 1995
 Update: Live At Pit Inn Shinjuku On December 16, 1995 (Take One, 1996) - recorded 1995
 Asian Spirits with Kang Tae Hwan and Masahiko Satoh (AD.forte, 1996)
 Moment Aug,15 (BAJ Records, 1997)
 Freedom Joy with Richie Beirach (Trial, 1998) - recorded 1997
 Live at Dolphy (Trial, 1998)
 Passing In The Silence (Transheart, 2000)
 Contrast with Masahiko Satoh (EWE, 2002)
 Live at Köln (JamRice, 2004) - recorded 2002
 Inductions with Masahiko Satoh (BAJ, 2009)

References
Yozo Iwanami and Kazunori Sugiyama, "Masahiko Togashi". The New Grove Dictionary of Jazz, 2nd edn., ed. Barry Kernfeld.

1940 births
2007 deaths
Japanese jazz composers
Japanese jazz drummers
Male jazz composers
Musicians from Tokyo
20th-century jazz composers
20th-century Japanese male musicians